The Bârlui is a left tributary of the river Olteț in Romania. It discharges into the Olteț in Butoi. It passes through the villages Poiana Mare, Morunești, Bărăști, Bechet, Braneț, Olari and Butoi.

References

Rivers of Romania
Rivers of Olt County